The Bangville Police (also known as Bangville Police) is a 1913 comedy short starring Fred Mace, Mabel Normand and the Keystone Cops (Mace, Raymond Hatton, Edgar Kennedy, Ford Sterling, and Al St. John).  The one-reel film, generally regarded as the seminal Keystone Cops short, was directed by Henry Lehrman.

Plot
A farmer and his daughter (Mabel Normand) are in the barn. She is saying she wishes the cow would have a calf. Left alone in the  house she hears strangers in the barn and calls the police. She barricades herself in. Her parents return and have to break the door down. She thinks it is the robbers. Meanwhile, a smokey car brings the police (the Keystone Cops). After misunderstandings are resolved they find a new-born calf in the barn.

Cast
 Fred Mace ... Police Chief
 Mabel Normand ... Farm Girl
 Nick Cogley ... Father
 Dot Farley ... Mother
 Betty Schade
 Raymond Hatton ... Policeman
 Edgar Kennedy ... Policeman
 Hank Mann ... Policeman
 Ford Sterling ... Policeman
 Al St. John ... Policeman

References

External links

 
 
 
 

1913 comedy films
1913 films
1913 short films
American black-and-white films
Silent American comedy films
American silent short films
Films directed by Henry Lehrman
Keystone Studios films
1910s police comedy films
American comedy short films
Mutual Film films
1910s American films